Triplophysa heyangensis is a species of stone loach endemic to China. Its type locality is a stream draining to the Yellow River near Hanshutau village, Heyang County, Shaanxi.

References

heyangensis
Freshwater fish of China
Endemic fauna of China
Fish described in 1992